EC 3.8.1 is the Nomenclature Committee of the International Union of Biochemistry and Molecular Biology's (NC-IUBMB) classification for C-Halide compounds.

List
 EC 3.8.1.1 alkylhalidase
 EC 3.8.1.2 (S)-2-haloacid dehalogenase
 EC 3.8.1.3 haloacetate dehalogenase
 EC 3.8.1.4 moved  to  EC 1.97.1.10
 EC 3.8.1.5 haloalkane dehalogenase
 EC 3.8.1.6 4-chlorobenzoate dehalogenase
 EC 3.8.1.7 4-chlorobenzoyl-CoA dehalogenase
 EC 3.8.1.8 atrazine chlorohydrolase
 EC 3.8.1.9 (R)-2-haloacid dehalogenase
 EC 3.8.1.10 2-haloacid dehalogenase (configuration-inverting)
 EC 3.8.1.11 2-haloacid dehalogenase (configuration-retaining)

References
 NC-IUMB EC 3.8.1 page at Queen Mary, University of London

 
EC 3.8